In mathematics, subgroup growth is a branch of group theory, dealing with quantitative questions about subgroups of a given group.

Let  be a finitely generated group.

Subgroup growth studies these functions, their interplay, and the characterization of group theoretical properties in terms of these functions.

The theory was motivated by the desire to enumerate finite groups of given order, and the analogy with Mikhail Gromov's notion of word growth.

Nilpotent groups
Let  be a finitely generated torsionfree nilpotent group. Then there exists a composition series with infinite cyclic factors, which induces a bijection (not though necessarily a homomorphism).

such that group multiplication can be expressed by polynomial functions in these coordinates; in particular, the multiplication is definable. Using methods from the model theory of p-adic integers, F. Grunewald, D. Segal and G. Smith showed that the local zeta function

As an example, let  be the discrete Heisenberg group. This group has a "presentation" with generators  and relations

Hence, elements of  can be represented as triples  of integers with group operation given by

Note that  has a normal series

with infinite cyclic factors. In general, it is quite complicated to determine the set of good bases for a fixed subgroup . To overcome this difficulty, one determines the set of all good bases of all finite index subgroups, and determines how many of these belong to one given subgroup. To make this precise, one has to embed the Heisenberg group over the integers into the group over p-adic numbers. After some computations, one arrives at the formula

such that

is a good basis of some finite-index subgroup. The latter condition can be translated into

.

Now, the integral can be transformed into an iterated sum to yield

where the final evaluation consists of repeated application of the formula for the value of the geometric series. From this we deduce that  can be expressed in terms of the Riemann zeta function as

The local factor

can always be expressed as a definable -adic integral. Moreover, M. du Sautoy and F. Grunewald showed that the integral can be approximated by Artin L-functions. Using the fact that Artin L-functions are holomorphic in a neighbourhood of the line , they showed that for any torsionfree nilpotent group, the function  is meromorphic in the domain

Using a Tauberian theorem this implies

for some real number  and a non-negative integer .

Congruence subgroups

Subgroup growth and coset representations
Let  be a group,  a subgroup of index .

Since the set

can be permuted in

Among all -actions, we can distinguish transitive actions by a sifting argument, to arrive at the following formula

where  denotes the number of homomorphisms

As an example, let  be the free group on two generators. Then every map of the generators of  extends to a homomorphism

that is

From this we deduce

For more complicated examples, the estimation of  involves the representation theory and statistical properties of symmetric groups.

References

Infinite group theory
Zeta and L-functions